Biswanath Mukherjee is an Indian-American Distinguished Professor of computer science at University of California, Davis. He is also a fellow of IEEE.

Early life
Mukherjee obtained his bachelor's degree in technology with honors from Indian Institute of Technology Kharagpur in 1980 and got his Ph.D. from University of Washington in 1987. The same year (1987) he joined the Department of Computer Science at University of California, Davis where he became a Professor in 1995, and a Distinguished Professor in 2011. From 1997 to 2000 he served as chair of the Computer Science Department. He was a founding member of the Board of Directors (2002-2007) of IPLocks, Inc., a Silicon Valley startup company acquired by Fortinet. During 1995–2000, he held the Child Family Professorship at UC Davis. To date, he has supervised 77 PhDs to completion and currently mentors 6 advisees, mainly Ph.D. students.

Career

Besides being a computer scientist, he also served on editorial boards and was General Co-Chair of the IEEE/OSA Optical Fiber Communications (OFC) Conference 2011, Technical Program Co-Chair of OFC'2009, and Technical Program Chair of the IEEE INFOCOM'96 conference. He is Editor of Springer's Optical Networks Book Series. He has served on eight journal editorial boards, most notably IEEE/ACM Transactions on Networking and IEEE Network. In addition, he has guest-edited Special Issues of Proceedings of the IEEE, IEEE/OSA Journal of Lightwave Technology, IEEE Journal on Selected Areas in Communications, and IEEE Communications.He was the first elected chairman of Communication Society's Optical Networking Technical Committee. He was a founding member of the Board of Directors (2002-2007) of IPLocks, Inc., a Silicon Valley startup company, acquired by Fortinet, Inc. He also served as a founding member of the Board of Directors (2015-2018) of Optella, Inc., an optical components startup, acquired by Cosemi, Inc. To date, he has served on the Technical Advisory Board for over a dozen startup companies, including Teknovus (acquired by Broadcom), Intelligent Fiber Optic Systems, and LookAhead Decisions. He is the founder and President of Ennetix, Inc., a startup company incubated at UC Davis and developing AI-powered, cloud-based, application-centric network performance analytics and management software for improved user experience.

Major Contributions
First proposal/prototype for a network intrusion detection system (1990). L. Todd Heberlein, B. Mukherjee, et al., "A Network Security Monitor (NSM)," Proc., 1990 IEEE Symposium on Security and Privacy, pp. 296–304, Oakland, CA, May 1990.
First proposal/prototype for a filtering firewall (1990); today a $8B/yr industry . C. Kwok and B. Mukherjee, "Cut-through bridging for CSMA/CD Local Area Networks," IEEE Transactions on Communications, vol. 38, pp. 938–942, July 1990.
Many contributions and books on Optical backbone network design, IP over optical, virtualization, etc. (1991 onwards).
First proposal/prototype for dynamic bandwidth allocation in Ethernet optical access networks (2002); over 100 million units deployed worldwide. G. Kramer, B. Mukherjee, and G. Pesavento, "IPACT: A dynamic protocol for an Ethernet PON," IEEE Communications Magazine, vol. 40, no. 2, pp. 74–80, Feb. 2002.
First proposal to integrate optical and wireless networks (2007). Suman Sarkar, Sudhir Dixit, and Biswanath Mukherjee, "Hybrid Wireless-Optical Broadband Access Network (WOBAN): A Review of Relevant Challenges," IEEE/OSA Journal of Lightwave Technology, vol. 25, no. 11, Nov. 2007.

Keynote/Plenary Talks
(Since 2010)
May 13, 2019: "Rising Power of the Network User," 23rd Conference On Optical Network Design And Modelling (ONDM 2019), Athens, Greece.
December 19, 2018: "Rising Power of the Network User," 12th IEEE International Conference on Advanced Networks and Telecommunications Systems (ANTS), Indore, India.
July 19, 2018: "Rising Power of the Network User," DOE Mini-Symposium on Data over Distance: Convergence of Networking, Storage, Transport, and Software, Hanover, MD, USA.
June 20, 2018: "Rising Power of the Network User," European Conference on Networks and Communications (EuCNC) 2018, Ljubljana, Slovenia.
January 5, 2017: "Cloud Computing and Virtualization," Indian Science Congress, Tirupati, India.
January 5, 2017: "5G and IoT," Indian Science Congress, Tirupati, India.
September 24, 2016: "Disaster Resilience of Telecom Infrastructure," Chinacom, Chongqing, China.
September 13, 2016: "Disaster Resilience of Telecom Infrastructure," Reliable Networks Design and Modeling (RNDM) Conference, Halmstad, Sweden.
September 12, 2016: "Network Resilience for Massive Failures and Attacks," COST/RECODIS, Halmstad, Sweden.
March 4, 2016: "Network Adaptability to Combat Disaster Disruptions and Cascading Failures," National Communications Conference (NCC), IIT Gauhati, India.
February 29, 2016: Guest of Honor Lecture, Research Day, SRM University, Chennai, India.
March 25, 2015: "Network Adaptability from Disaster Disruption and Cascading Failures," Design of Reliable Computer Networks (DRCN) Conference, Kansas City, USA.
October 28, 2013: "Software-Defined Optical Networks (SDONs)," ETRI Annual Conference, Jeju, Korea.
April 18, 2013: "Panorama of Optical Network Survivability," Optical Network Design and Modeling (ONDM) Conference, Brest, France.
September 3, 2012: "Emerging Technology/Research Trends in Next Generation Optical Networks," Chief Guest and Inauguration Address, Faculty Development Program, SRM University, Chennai, India.
July 4, 2011: "Network Convergence in the Future Internet", at 12th International Conference on High Performance Switching and Routing (HPSR), Cartagena, Spain.
June 27, 2011: "Some “Opaque” Problems in Transparent Optical Networks", at International Conference on Transparent Optical Networks (ICTON), Stockholm, Sweden.
May 31, 2011: Brazilian Symposium on Networks and Distributed System (SBRC), Campo Grande, Brazil.
November 9, 2010: Guest Professorship Lecture: "Network Convergence in the Future Internet", at Beijing University of Posts and Telecommunications (BUPT), China.     
July 12, 2010: "Convergence in the Optical Internet (COIN)", at 9th Convergence in the Optical Internet (COIN), Jeju, Korea.

Awards
May 2018: Co-winner, Charles Kao Award (named after Nobel Laureate and Fiber Optic Pioneer Charles Kao) for the Best Paper in IEEE Journal on Optical Communications and Networks (JOCN) for the paper: D. Chitimalla, K. Kondepu, L. Valcarenghi, M. Tornatore, and B. Mukherjee, “5G Fronthaul–Latency and Jitter Studies of CPRI Over Ethernet,” IEEE Journal of Optical Communications & Networking, vol. 9, no. 2, pp. 172–182, February 2017.
Dec. 2017: Co-winner, IEEE Communications Society's Transmission, Access, and Optical Systems (TAOS) Best Paper Award for IEEE Globecom 2017 Optical Networks and Systems (ONS) Symposium, for the paper: Yu Wu, Massimo Tornatore, Yongli Zhao, and Biswanath Mukherjee, “TDM EPON Fronthaul Upstream Capacity Improvement Via Classification and Sifting ,” Proc., IEEE Globecom 2017, Singapore, Dec. 2017.
May 2016: Winner, UC Davis International Community Building Award.
December 2015: Winner of the IEEE Communications Society's inaugural (2015) Outstanding Technical Achievement Award "for pioneering work on shaping the optical networking area".
2009: Winner, Outstanding Senior Faculty Award, College of Engineering, UC Davis.
2009: Winner, Outstanding Senior Faculty Award, College of Engineering, UC Davis.
November 2007: My PhD student Marwan Batayneh, myself, and our research collaborators Dr. Andreas Kirstädter, Dr. Dominic A. Schupke, and Dr. Marco Hoffman from Nokia Siemens Networks, Germany, won the IEEE Globecom 2007 Optical Networking Symposium Best Paper Award for the paper "Lightpath-Level Protection versus Connection-Level Protection for Carrier-Grade Ethernet in a Mixed-Line-Rate Telecom Network".
December 2006: B. Mukherjee elevated to IEEE Fellow.
February 2006: B. Mukherjee named to Child Family Professorship at UC Davis.
Winner 2004: Distinguished Graduate Mentoring Award, University of California, Davis.
Ph.D. Dissertation Award Supervisor, UC Davis College of Engineering 2004 Zuhair Munir Best Doctoral Dissertation Award, for Dr. Keyao Zhu's PhD Dissertation: Design and Analysis of Traffic-Groomable Optical WDM Networks.
Ph.D. Dissertation Award Supervisor, UC Davis College of Engineering 2000 Best Doctoral Dissertation Award, for Dr. Laxman Sahasrabuddhe's PhD Dissertation: Multicasting and Fault Tolerance in WDM Optical Networks.
1992: My papers "WDM-Based Local Lightwave Networks – Part I: Single-Hop Networks; Part II: Multihop Networks," in IEEE Network were nominated for IEEE and IEEE Communications Society Prize Paper Awards.
1994: Co-winner, Paper Award, 17th National Computer Security Conference, for the paper "Testing Intrusion Detection Systems: Design Methodologies and Results from an Early Prototype."
1991: Co-winner, Best Paper Award, 14th National Computer Security Conference, for the paper "DIDS (Distributed Intrusion Detection System – Motivation, Architecture, and an Early Prototype."
1986–87: General Electric Foundation Fellowship, University of Washington.
1984–85: GTE Teaching Fellowship, University of Washington.

Works

Journal Papers and Conference Proceedings

For a complete list of works visit Google Scholar Profile.

Books Published

Biswanath Mukherjee, Optical WDM Networks, Springer, 2006.
Biswanath Mukherjee, Optical Communication Networks, New York, NY: McGraw-Hill, July 1997.
Canhui (Sam) Ou and Biswanath Mukherjee, Survivable Optical WDM Networks, Springer, 2005.
Keyao Zhu, Hongyue Zhu, and Biswanath Mukherjee, Traffic Grooming in Optical WDM Mesh Networks, Springer, 2005

Technical Reports (Selected)
B. Mukherjee, "The p(i)-persistent protocol and voice-data integration for unidirectional broadcast bus networks,"Ph.D. dissertation, Department of Electrical Engineering, University of Washington, Seattle, WA, May 1987. (Also, Technical Report No. 241, Department of Electrical Engineering, University of Washington, Seattle, WA, May 1987.)
J. Cai and B. Mukherjee, "Design, development, and measured performance of a 3C505-based CSMA/CD bridge,"Technical Report No. CSE-90-8, Division of Computer Science, University of California, Davis, CA, March 1990.
G. V. Dias, K. N. Levitt, and B. Mukherjee, "Modeling Attacks on Computer Systems: Evaluating Vulnerabilities and Forming a Basis for Attack July, Detection,"Technical Report No. CSE-90-41, Division of Computer Science, University of California, Davis, CA, 1990.
A. S. Acampora, L. G. Kazovsky, V. W. S. Chan, K.-W. Cheung, E. Desurvire, L. F. Eastman, J. Escobar, A. Ganz, M. Gerla, P. A. Humblet, M. N. Islam, S. Kang, K. Liu, B. Mukherjee, P. R. Prucnal, R. Ramaswami, I. Rubin, A. A. M. Saleh, J. Sauer, and C. M. Verber, "Proposal for a New National Science Foundation Program on Optical Networks,"NSF Technical Report, March 1993.
B. Mukherjee, F. Neri, et al."Report of US/EU Workshop on Key Issues and Grand Challenges in Optical Networking,"Brussels, Belgium, June 2006.

References

External links

Living people
20th-century births
Indian computer scientists
Fellow Members of the IEEE
University of California, Davis faculty
IIT Kharagpur alumni
Year of birth missing (living people)